United Nations Security Council resolution 791, adopted unanimously on 30 November 1992, after recalling resolutions 637 (1989), 693 (1991), 714 (1991), 729 (1992) and 784 (1992), the Council approved a decision by the Secretary-General Boutros Boutros-Ghali to extend the mandate of the United Nations Observer Mission in El Salvador (ONUSAL) for a further six months until 31 May 1993.

The Council welcomed the intention of the Secretary-General to adapt the future activities and strength of ONUSAL after the recent progress in peace talks, reaffirming the use of his good offices with regard to the peace progress. It also urged both parties, the Farabundo Martí National Liberation Front and Government of El Salvador, to implement and respect the agreements signed by them in Mexico City on 16 January 1992 and exercise utmost restraint.

The resolution also asked for voluntary contributions from Member States and international financial and developmental institutions towards the peace process, and for the Secretary-General to keep the Security Council informed on developments before the current mandate ends.

See also
 List of United Nations Security Council Resolutions 701 to 800 (1991–1993)
 Salvadoran Civil War
 United Nations Observer Group in Central America

References

External links
 
Text of the Resolution at undocs.org

 0791
Political history of El Salvador
20th century in El Salvador
Salvadoran Civil War
 0791
November 1992 events
1992 in El Salvador